Wei Liang (born February 1953) is a retired general (shangjiang) in the Chinese People's Liberation Army. He served as Political Commissar of the Southern Theater Command.

Biography 
Originally from Gaochun County (now Gaochun District), Jiangsu, Wei served in the 26th Army, then the People's Armed Police, before joining the Guangzhou Military Region in a leadership position. He earned the rank of General in July 2014.  Between 2012 and 2016, he was the Political Commissar of the Guangzhou Military Region. He was a member of the 18th Central Committee of the Chinese Communist Party.

References

1953 births
Living people
People's Liberation Army generals from Jiangsu
Members of the 18th Central Committee of the Chinese Communist Party
Political commissars of the Guangzhou Military Region
Political commissars of Southern Theater Command
Politicians from Nanjing
Chinese Communist Party politicians from Jiangsu
People's Republic of China politicians from Jiangsu